These are the enlistment ages for military service by country, according to the online CIA publication The World Factbook.



A 
 – 19 (voluntary; age lowered to 18 during wartime)
 – 19 (compulsory)
 – 18 (voluntary – men), 20 (voluntary – women), 20 (compulsory – men)
 – 18 (voluntary)
 – 18 (voluntary)
 – 18 (compulsory)
 – 18 (voluntary; age 17 with parental consent)
 – 17 (voluntary), 18 (compulsory)
 – 17 (voluntary), 18 (compulsory)

B 

 – 18 (voluntary)
 –  18 (voluntary)
 – 16 (voluntary)
 – 18 (voluntary)
 –  18 (compulsory)
 – 18 (voluntary)
 – 18 (voluntary)
 – 18 (compulsory)
 – 18 (voluntary), 20 (compulsory militia training)
 –  18 (voluntary)
 – 18 (voluntary)
 – 18 (voluntary)
 – 18 (compulsory)
 – 17 (voluntary)
 – 18 (voluntary)
 – 18 (voluntary)
 – 18 (voluntary)

C 
 – 17 (voluntary), 18 (compulsory)
 – 18 (compulsory)
 – 18 (voluntary)
 – 18 (voluntary; volunteers can join the Reserves and enter the Military Colleges at age 16, or join the regular forces at age 17 with parental consent)
 – 18 (voluntary)
 – 18 (voluntary), 20 (compulsory – men), 21 (compulsory – women)
 – 18 (voluntary)
 – 18 (compulsory; only registration is compulsory. People do not have to serve in the military)
 – 18 (compulsory)
 – 18 (voluntary)
 – 18 (compulsory)
 – 18 (voluntary)
 – 18 (compulsory; conscription not enforced)
 – 18 (voluntary)
 – 17 (compulsory)
 – 17 (voluntary), 18 (compulsory for Greek Cypriots only)
 – 18 (voluntary)

D 
 – 18 (compulsory)
 – 18 (voluntary)
 – 17 (voluntary)

E 
 – 18 (compulsory; conscription is currently suspended until further notice)
 –  18 (compulsory)
 –  18 (compulsory)
 – 18 (compulsory)
 – 18 (compulsory)
 – 18 (compulsory)
 – 18 (voluntary)
 – 18 (voluntary)

F 
 – 18 (voluntary)
 – 18 (compulsory)
 – 18 (voluntary)

G 
 – 20 (voluntary).
 – 18 (compulsory).
 – 18 (compulsory).
 – 17 (parental consent).
 – 18 (voluntary).
 – 18 (voluntary), 19 (compulsory; conscription age can be lowered to 17 during wartime).
 – 17 (compulsory).
 – 18 (voluntary).
 – 16 (voluntary, with parental consent), 18 (compulsory).
 – 18 (voluntary).

H 
 – 18 (voluntary)
 – 18 (voluntary)

I 
 – 17 (voluntary)
 – 18 (voluntary)
 – 18 (compulsory)
 – 18 (voluntary)
 – 18 (voluntary) 
 – 17 (voluntary), 18 (compulsory for Jews and Druze only)
 – 18 (voluntary)

J 
 – 17 (voluntary)
 – 18 (voluntary)
 – 17 (voluntary)

K 
 – 18 (compulsory)
 – 18 (voluntary)
 – 17 (compulsory)
 – 18 (compulsory)
 – 17 (voluntary)
 – 18 (compulsory), 19 (voluntary – women)

L 
 – 18 (compulsory)
 – 18 (voluntary)
 – 17 (voluntary)
 – 18 (voluntary)
 – 18 (voluntary)
 – 18 (voluntary)
 – 18 (compulsory)
 – 18 (voluntary)

M 
 – 18 (compulsory)
 – 18 (voluntary)
 – 17 (voluntary)
 – 18 (voluntary)
 – 18 (compulsory)
 – 18 (voluntary)
 – 18 (voluntary), 18 (compulsory, conscription not enforced)
 – 16 (voluntary, with parental consent), 18 (compulsory)
 – 18 (compulsory)
 – 18 (compulsory)
 – 18 (voluntary)
 – 20 (voluntary)
 – 18 (compulsory)
 – 18 (voluntary)

N 
 – 18 (voluntary)
 – 18 (voluntary)
 – 17 (voluntary)
 – 17 (voluntary; soldiers are not deployed in combat before the age of 18)
 – 18 (voluntary)
 – 18 (compulsory)
 – 18 (voluntary)
 – 18 (voluntary)
 – 17 (voluntary – men), 18 (voluntary – women), 19 (compulsory; conscription age can be lowered to 16 during wartime)

O 
 – 18 (voluntary)

P 
 – 16 (voluntary; soldiers cannot be deployed to combat before the age of 18)
 – 18 (voluntary; age 16 with parental consent)
 – 18 (compulsory)
 – 18 (voluntary)
 – 17 (voluntary)
 – 18 (voluntary; enlistment age can be lowered to 17 during wartime)
 – 18 (voluntary)

Q 
 – 18 (compulsory)

R 
 – 18 (voluntary)
 –  18 (compulsory)
 – 18 (voluntary)

S 
 – 18 (voluntary)
 – 18 (voluntary)
 – 17 (voluntary), 18 (compulsory)
 – 17 (voluntary)
 – 18 (voluntary), 20 (compulsory)
 – 18 (voluntary)
 – 18 (voluntary)
 – 18 (voluntary)
 – 16.5 (voluntary), 18 (compulsory)
 – 18 (voluntary)
 – 18 (voluntary)
 – 18 (compulsory)
 – 18 (voluntary)
 – 18 (compulsory)
 – 18 (voluntary)
 – 18 (voluntary)
 – 18 (compulsory)
 – 18 (voluntary)
 – 18 (voluntary)
 – 18 (voluntary), 19 (compulsory)
 – 18 (compulsory)

T 
 – 19 (compulsory)
 – 18 (compulsory)
 – 18 (voluntary)
 – 18 (voluntary), 21 (compulsory)
 – 18 (voluntary)
 – 18 (voluntary)
 – 18 (voluntary; age 16 with parental consent)
 – 18 (voluntary; age 16 with parental consent)
 – 18 (voluntary), 20 (compulsory)
 – 18 (voluntary), 21 (compulsory)
 – 18 (compulsory)

U 
 – 18 (voluntary)
 – 20 (compulsory; conscription is planned to be abolished in the future)
 – 17 (voluntary, with consent), 18 (compulsory)
 – 18 (voluntary; age 16 with parental consent; age 17 for admission to an officer program; Nepalese citizens can join the Brigade of Gurkhas at age 17)
 – 18 (voluntary registration),  18 (voluntary service; age 17 with parental consent), 17 (compulsory militia service under 10 U.S. Code § 246)
 – 18 (voluntary)
 – 18 (compulsory)

V 
 - 19 years old. The Holy See maintains a small volunteer force of Swiss nationals who make up the Pontifical Swiss Guard.
 – 18 (compulsory)
 – 18 (compulsory)

Y 
 – 18 (voluntary)

Z 
 – 18 (voluntary; age 16 with parental consent)
 – 18 (voluntary)

References

Online CIA publication The World Factbook

External links
Military service ages and obligation

 
Military lists
Military sociology